The Texas Rangers 1988 season involved the Rangers finishing 6th in the American League West with a record of 70 wins and 91 losses.

Offseason
 December 13, 1987: Bárbaro Garbey was signed as a free agent with the Texas Rangers.
 December 21, 1987: Greg A. Harris was released by the Texas Rangers.
 March 25, 1988: Mike Loynd was traded by the Rangers to the Houston Astros for Robbie Wine.

Regular season

Opening Day starters
 Jerry Browne
 Steve Buechele
 Scott Fletcher
 Charlie Hough
 Pete Incaviglia
 Oddibe McDowell
 Pete O'Brien
 Larry Parrish
 Geno Petralli
 Rubén Sierra

Season standings

Record vs. opponents

Detailed records

Notable transactions
 April 4, 1988: Guy Hoffman was signed as a free agent by the Rangers.
 July 21, 1988: Jim Sundberg was signed as a free agent by the Rangers.
 July 27, 1988: Iván Rodríguez was signed by the Rangers as an amateur free agent.
 August 30, 1988: Dale Mohorcic was traded by the Rangers to the New York Yankees for Cecilio Guante.
 September 1, 1988: Tom O'Malley was traded by the Rangers to the Montreal Expos for a player to be named later. The Expos completed the deal by sending Jack Daugherty to the Rangers on September 13.

Roster

Game log

|- style="background:#cfc;"
| 1 || April 4 || Indians || 4–3 || || || || 1–0 || W1
|- style="background:#fbb;"
| 2 || April 6 || Indians || 1–5 || || || || 1–1 || L1
|- style="background:#fbb;"
| 3 || April 7 || Indians || 1–4 || || || || 1–2 || L2
|- style="background:#fbb;"
| 4 || April 8 || Red Sox || 0–4 || || || || 1–3 || L3
|- style="background:#fbb;"
| 5 || April 9 || Red Sox || 1–2 || || || || 1–4 || L4
|- style="background:#cfc;"
| 6 || April 10 || Red Sox || 4–1 || || || || 2–4 || W1
|- style="background:#fbb;"
| 7 || April 12 || @ Tigers || 1–4 || || || || 2–5 || L1
|- style="background:#cfc;"
| 8 || April 14 || @ Tigers || 2–1 || || || || 3–5 || W1
|- style="background:#cfc;"
| 9 || April 15 || @ Red Sox || 3–2 (10) || || || || 4–5 || W2
|- style="background:#cfc;"
| 10 || April 16 || @ Red Sox || 2–0 || || || || 5–5 || W3
|- style="background:#fbb;"
| 11 || April 17 || @ Red Sox || 2–15 || || || || 5–6 || L1
|- style="background:#fbb;"
| 12 || April 18 || @ Red Sox || 3–4 || || || || 5–7 || L2
|- style="background:#cfc;"
| 13 || April 19 || @ Indians || 3–0 || || || || 6–7 || W1
|- style="background:#fbb;"
| 14 || April 20 || @ Indians || 1–2 || || || || 6–8 || L1
|- style="background:#fbb;"
| 15 || April 22 || Tigers || 3–5 || || || || 6–9 || L2
|- style="background:#fbb;"
| 16 || April 23 || Tigers || 6–7 || || || || 6–10 || L3
|- style="background:#cfc;"
| 17 || April 24 || Tigers || 4–2 || || || || 7–10 || W1
|- style="background:#cfc;"
| 18 || April 26 || Brewers || 3–1 || || || || 8–10 || W2
|- style="background:#fbb;"
| 19 || April 27 || Brewers || 3–4 || || || || 8–11 || L1
|- style="background:#fbb;"
| 20 || April 29 || @ Yankees || 1–2 || || || || 8–12 || L2
|- style="background:#fbb;"
| 21 || April 30 || @ Yankees || 3–15 || || || || 8–13 || L3
|-

|- style="background:#cfc;"
| 22 || May 1 || @ Yankees || 5–1 || || || || 9–13 || W1
|- style="background:#fbb;"
| 23 || May 2 || @ Orioles || 4–9 || || || || 9–14 || L1
|- style="background:#cfc;"
| 24 || May 3 || @ Orioles || 4–2 || || || || 10–14 || W1
|- style="background:#fbb;"
| 25 || May 4 || @ Brewers || 5–6 || || || || 10–15 || L1
|- style="background:#fbb;"
| 26 || May 5 || @ Brewers || 1–9 || || || || 10–16 || L2
|- style="background:#cfc;"
| 27 || May 6 || Yankees || 7–6 || || || || 11–16 || W1
|- style="background:#cfc;"
| 28 || May 7 || Yankees || 3–2 || || || || 12–16 || W2
|- style="background:#cfc;"
| 29 || May 8 || Yankees || 10–8 || || || || 13–16 || W3
|- style="background:#cfc;"
| 30 || May 10 || Orioles || 13–5 || || || || 14–16 || W4
|- style="background:#cfc;"
| 31 || May 11 || Orioles || 8–0 || || || || 15–16 || W5
|- style="background:#cfc;"
| 32 || May 12 || Orioles || 2–1 || || || || 16–16 || W6
|- style="background:#cfc;"
| 33 || May 13 || Royals || 2–1 || || || || 17–16 || W7
|- style="background:#cfc;"
| 34 || May 14 || Royals || 6–3 || || || || 18–16 || W8
|- style="background:#fbb;"
| 35 || May 15 || Royals || 4–5 || || || || 18–17 || L1
|- style="background:#fbb;"
| 36 || May 16 || Royals || 6–7 || || || || 18–18 || L2
|- style="background:#cfc;"
| 37 || May 17 || @ Blue Jays || 7–6 (14) || || || || 19–18 || W1
|- style="background:#cfc;"
| 38 || May 18 || @ Blue Jays || 4–0 || || || || 20–18 || W2
|- style="background:#fbb;"
| - || May 20 || Twins || colspan=7 | Postponed (rain); Makeup: May 22
|- style="background:#cfc;"
| 39 || May 21 || Twins || 3–0 || || || || 21–18 || W3
|- style="background:#fbb;"
| 40 || May 22 || Twins || 5–15 || || || || 21–19 || L1
|- style="background:#fbb;"
| 41 || May 22 || Twins || 2–4 || || || || 21–20 || L2
|- style="background:#fbb;"
| 42 || May 24 || Blue Jays || 2–13 || || || || 21–21 || L3
|- style="background:#cfc;"
| 43 || May 25 || Blue Jays || 5–1 || || || || 22–21 || W1
|- style="background:#cfc;"
| 44 || May 26 || Blue Jays || 8–7 || || || || 23–21 || W2
|- style="background:#cfc;"
| 45 || May 27 || @ Royals || 3–2 || || || || 24–21 || W3
|- style="background:#fbb;"
| 46 || May 28 || @ Royals || 6–8 || || || || 24–22 || L1
|- style="background:#fbb;"
| 47 || May 29 || @ Royals || 1–12 || || || || 24–23 || L2
|- style="background:#fbb;"
| 48 || May 30 || @ Twins || 6–1 || || || || 25–23 || W1
|- style="background:#fbb;"
| 49 || May 31 || @ Twins || 6–8 || || || || 25–24 || L1
|-

|- style="background:#fbb;"
| 50 || June 1 || @ Twins || 1–7 || || || || 25–25 || L2
|- style="background:#cfc;"
| 51 || June 2 || @ White Sox || 10–2 || || || || 26–25 || W1
|- style="background:#cfc;"
| 52 || June 3 || @ White Sox || 9–3 || || || || 27–25 || W2
|- style="background:#fbb;"
| 53 || June 4 || @ White Sox || 8–10 || || || || 27–26 || L1
|- style="background:#fbb;"
| 54 || June 5 || @ White Sox || 4–5 || || || || 27–27 || L2
|- style="background:#cfc;"
| 55 || June 6 || Angels || 6–4 || || || || 28–27 || W1
|- style="background:#fbb;"
| 56 || June 7 || Angels || 0–1 || || || || 28–28 || L1
|- style="background:#fbb;"
| 57 || June 8 || Angels || 2–5 || || || || 28–29 || L2
|- style="background:#cfc;"
| 58 || June 9 || Athletics || 5–2 || || || || 29–29 || W1
|- style="background:#fbb;"
| 59 || June 10 || Athletics || 6–7 || || || || 29–30 || L1
|- style="background:#fbb;"
| 60 || June 11 || Athletics || 4–13 || || || || 29–31 || L2
|- style="background:#cfc;"
| 61 || June 12 || Athletics || 3–2 || || || || 30–31 || W1
|- style="background:#fbb;"
| 62 || June 14 || @ Angels || 0–3 || || || || 30–32 || L1
|- style="background:#cfc;"
| 63 || June 15 || @ Angels || 6–3 (10) || || || || 31–32 || W1
|- style="background:#fbb;"
| 64 || June 16 || @ Angels || 0–3 || || || || 31–33 || L1
|- style="background:#fbb;"
| 65 || June 17 || @ Athletics || 6–7 (14) || || || || 31–34 || L2
|- style="background:#fbb;"
| 66 || June 18 || @ Athletics || 1–2 (13) || || || || 31–35 || L3
|- style="background:#cfc;"
| 67 || June 19 || @ Athletics || 5–4 <small>(11)</smsll> || || || || 32–35 || W1
|- style="background:#cfc;"
| 68 || June 20 || Mariners || 4–3 || || || || 33–35 || W2
|- style="background:#cfc;"
| 69 || June 21 || Mariners || 6–0 || || || || 34–35 || W3
|- style="background:#fbb;"
| 70 || June 22 || Mariners || 2–3 (10) || || || || 34–36 || L1
|- style="background:#cfc;"
| 71 || June 24 || White Sox || 5–2 || || || || 35–36 || W1
|- style="background:#fbb;"
| 72 || June 25 || White Sox || 5–10 || || || || 35–37 || L1
|- style="background:#fbb;"
| 73 || June 26 || White Sox || 5–7 || || || || 35–38 || L2
|- style="background:#fbb;"
| 74 || June 27 || @ Mariners || 3–6 || || || || 35–39 || L3
|- style="background:#cfc;"
| 75 || June 28 || @ Mariners || 6–0 || || || || 36–39 || W1
|- style="background:#cfc;"
| 76 || June 29 || @ Mariners || 1–0 (12) || || || || 37–39 || W2
|-

|- style="background:#fbb;"
| 77 || July 1 || Orioles || 1–7 || || || || 37–40 || L1
|- style="background:#fbb;"
| 78 || July 2 || Orioles || 4–7 || || || || 37–41 || L2
|- style="background:#cfc;"
| 79 || July 3 || Orioles || 13–1 || || || || 38–41 || W1
|- style="background:#fbb;"
| 80 || July 4 || Yankees || 2–13 || || || || 38–42 || L1
|- style="background:#fbb;"
| 81 || July 5 || Yankees || 3–5 || || || || 38–43 || L2
|- style="background:#cfc;"
| 82 || July 6 || Yankees || 4–2 || || || || 39–43 || W1
|- style="background:#fbb;"
| 83 || July 7 || @ Orioles || 0–6 || || || || 39–44 || L1
|- style="background:#cfc;"
| 84 || July 8 || @ Orioles || 8–5 || || || || 40–44 || W1
|- style="background:#fbb;"
| 85 || July 9 || @ Orioles || 1–4 || || || || 40–45 || L1
|- style="background:#fbb;"
| 86 || July 10 || @ Orioles || 1–2 || || || || 40–46 || L2
|- style="background:#fbb;"
| 87 || July 14 || Brewers || 2–6 || || || || 40–47 || L3
|- style="background:#fbb;"
| 88 || July 15 || Brewers || 2–4 || || || || 40–48 || L4
|- style="background:#fbb;"
| 89 || July 16 || Brewers || 3–4 || || || || 40–49 || L5
|- style="background:#cfc;"
| 90 || July 17 || Brewers || 3–0 || || || || 41–49 || W1
|- style="background:#fbb;"
| 91 || July 18 || @ Yankees || 2–7 || || || || 41–50 || L1
|- style="background:#cfc;"
| 92 || July 19 || @ Yankees || 7–2 || || || || 42–51 || W1
|- style="background:#fbb;"
| 93 || July 21 || @ Brewers || 1–6 || || || || 42–51 || L1
|- style="background:#fbb;"
| 94 || July 22 || @ Brewers || 1–2 || || || || 42–52 || L2
|- style="background:#cfc;"
| 95 || July 23 || @ Brewers || 7–4 || || || || 43–52 || W1
|- style="background:#cfc;"
| 96 || July 24 || @ Brewers || 6–4 || || || || 44–52 || W2
|- style="background:#fbb;"
| 97 || July 25 || Red Sox || 0–2 || || || || 44–53 || L1
|- style="background:#cfc;"
| 98 || July 26 || Red Sox || 9–8 || || || || 45–53 || W1
|- style="background:#fbb;"
| 99 || July 27 || Red Sox || 7–10 || || || || 45–54 || L1
|- style="background:#fbb;"
| 100 || July 29 || @ Tigers || 2–3 || || || || 45–55 || L2
|- style="background:#cfc;"
| 101 || July 29 || @ Tigers || 2–1 || || || || 46–55 || W1
|- style="background:#fbb;"
| 102 || July 30 || @ Tigers || 0–3 || || || || 46–56 || L1
|- style="background:#fbb;"
| 103 || July 31 || @ Tigers || 1–5 || || || || 46–57 || L2
|-

|- style="background:#fbb;"
| 104 || August 2 || @ Red Sox || 2–7 || || || || 46–58 || L3
|- style="background:#fbb;"
| 105 || August 3 || @ Red Sox || 4–5 || || || || 47–59 || L4
|- style="background:#cfc;"
| 106 || August 5 || Indians || 8–4 || || || || 47–59 || W1
|- style="background:#fbb;"
| 107 || August 6 || Indians || 3–5 || || || || 47–60 || L1
|- style="background:#cfc;"
| 108 || August 7 || Indians || 2–0 || || || || 48–60 || W1
|- style="background:#fbb;"
| 109 || August 8 || Tigers || 2–3 || || || || 48–61 || L1
|- style="background:#cfc;"
| 110 || August 9 || Tigers || 6–2 || || || || 49–61 || W1
|- style="background:#fbb;"
| 111 || August 10 || Tigers || 1–2 || || || || 49–62 || L1
|- style="background:#cfc;"
| 112 || August 11 || @ Indians || 5–4 || || || || 50–62 || W1
|- style="background:#fbb;"
| 113 || August 12 || @ Indians || 3–6 || || || || 50–63 || L1
|- style="background:#cfc;"
| 114 || August 13 || @ Indians || 12–3 || || || || 51–63 || W1
|- style="background:#fbb;"
| 115 || August 14 || @ Indians || 0–3 || || || || 51–64 || L1
|- style="background:#fbb;"
| 116 || August 15 || @ Royals || 3–12 || || || || 51–65 || L2
|- style="background:#cfc;"
| 117 || August 16 || @ Royals || 5–4 || || || || 52–65 || W1
|- style="background:#fbb;"
| 118 || August 17 || @ Royals || 6–9 || || || || 52–66 || L1
|- style="background:#cfc;"
| 119 || August 18 || @ Twins || 4–2 || || || || 53–66 || W1
|- style="background:#cfc;"
| 120 || August 19 || @ Twins || 5–0 || || || || 54–66 || W2
|- style="background:#cfc;"
| 121 || August 20 || @ Twins || 3–2 || || || || 55–66 || W3
|- style="background:#fbb;"
| 122 || August 21 || @ Twins || 2–12 || || || || 55–67 || L1
|- style="background:#cfc;"
| 123 || August 22 || Royals || 9–5 || || || || 56–67 || W1
|- style="background:#fbb;"
| 124 || August 23 || Royals || 7–11 || || || || 56–68 || L1
|- style="background:#cfc;"
| 125 || August 24 || Royals || 7–4 || || || || 57–68 || W1
|- style="background:#cfc;"
| 126 || August 26 || Blue Jays || 5–1 || || || || 58–68 || W2
|- style="background:#cfc;"
| 127 || August 27 || Blue Jays || 5–3 || || || || 59–68 || W3
|- style="background:#fbb;"
| 128 || August 28 || Blue Jays || 5–6 (11) || || || || 59–69 || L1
|- style="background:#fbb;"
| 129 || August 29 || Twins || 2–3 || || || || 59–70 || L2
|- style="background:#cfc;"
| 130 || August 30 || Twins || 8–6 || || || || 60–70 || W1
|- style="background:#fbb;"
| 131 || August 31 || Twins || 1–10 || || || || 60–71 || L1
|-

|- style="background:#fbb;"
| 132 || September 1 || @ Blue Jays || 1–5 || || || || 60–72 || L2
|- style="background:#fbb;"
| 133 || September 2 || @ Blue Jays || 6–7 || || || || 60–73 || L3
|- style="background:#fbb;"
| 134 || September 3 || @ Blue Jays || 4–7 || || || || 60–74 || L4
|- style="background:#fbb;"
| 135 || September 4 || @ Blue Jays || 7–9 || || || || 60–75 || L5
|- style="background:#fbb;"
| 136 || September 5 || Athletics || 4–11 || || || || 60–76 || L6
|- style="background:#cfc;"
| 137 || September 6 || Athletics || 3–1 || || || || 61–76 || W1
|- style="background:#fbb;"
| 138 || September 7 || Athletics || 3–6 || || || || 61–77 || L1
|- style="background:#fbb;"
| 139 || September 8 || Angels || 3–4 || || || || 61–78 || L2
|- style="background:#fbb;"
| 140 || September 9 || Angels || 3–5 || || || || 61–79 || L3
|- style="background:#cfc;"
| 141 || September 10 || Angels || 3–2 (17) || || || || 62–79 || W1
|- style="background:#cfc;"
| 142 || September 11 || Angels || 8–3 || || || || 63–79 || W2
|- style="background:#fbb;"
| 143 || September 13 || @ Athletics || 1–2 || || || || 63–80 || L1
|- style="background:#cfc;"
| 144 || September 14 || @ Athletics || 9–1 || || || || 64–80 || W1
|- style="background:#fbb;"
| 145 || September 15 || @ Athletics || 2–6 || || || || 64–81 || L1
|- style="background:#fbb;"
| 146 || September 16 || @ Angels || 2–7 || || || || 64–82 || L2
|- style="background:#cfc;"
| 147 || September 17 || @ Angels || 7–4 || || || || 65–82 || W1
|- style="background:#fbb;"
| 148 || September 18 || @ Angels || 5–6 || || || || 65–83 || L1
|- style="background:#fbb;"
| 149 || September 19 || White Sox || 3–7 || || || || 65–84 || L2
|- style="background:#cfc;"
| 150 || September 20 || White Sox || 4–1 || || || || 66–84 || W1
|- style="background:#fbb;"
| 151 || September 21 || White Sox || 1–6 || || || || 66–85 || L1
|- style="background:#cfc;"
| 152 || September 23 || Mariners || 3–2 (10) || || || || 67–85 || W1
|- style="background:#fbb;"
| 153 || September 24 || Mariners || 0–3 || || || || 67–86 || L1
|- style="background:#fbb;"
| 154 || September 25 || Mariners || 5–8 || || || || 67–87 || L2
|- style="background:#cfc;"
| 155 || September 26 || @ White Sox || 5–3 || || || || 68–87 || W1
|- style="background:#fbb;"
| 156 || September 27 || @ White Sox || 2–3 || || || || 68–88 || L1
|- style="background:#fbb;"
| 157 || September 28 || @ White Sox || 2–3 || || || || 68–89 || L2
|- style="background:#fbb;"
| 158 || September 29 || @ Mariners || 1–5 || || || || 68–90 || L3
|- style="background:#cfc;"
| 159 || September 30 || @ Mariners || 11–6 || || || || 69–90 || W1
|-

|- style="background:#fbb;"
| 160 || October 1 || @ Mariners || 3–4 (11) || || || || 70–90 || L1
|- style="background:#cfc;"
| 161 || October 2 || @ Mariners || 7–2 || || || || 71–90 || W1
|-

|- style="text-align:center;"
| Legend:       = Win       = Loss       = PostponementBold = Rangers team member

Player stats

Batting

Starters by position
Note: Pos = Position; G = Games played; AB = At bats; H = Hits; Avg. = Batting average; HR = Home runs; RBI = Runs batted in

Other batters
Note: G = Games played; AB = At bats; H = Hits; Avg. = Batting average; HR = Home runs; RBI = Runs batted in

Pitching

Starting pitchers
Note: G = Games pitched; IP = Innings pitched; W = Wins; L = Losses; ERA = Earned run average; SO = Strikeouts

Other pitchers
Note: G = Games pitched; IP = Innings pitched; W = Wins; L = Losses; ERA = Earned run average; SO = Strikeouts

Relief pitchers
Note: G = Games pitched; W = Wins; L = Losses; SV = Saves; ERA = Earned run average; SO = Strikeouts

Farm system 

LEAGUE CHAMPIONS: Tulsa

References

 1988 Texas Rangers at Baseball Reference
 1988 Texas Rangers at Baseball Almanac
 

Texas Rangers seasons
Texas Rangers season
Texas Rang